Solihull Lodge is a residential area of Solihull (to the southwest of Shirley), near its border with Birmingham (Yardley Wood and Warstock areas).  The area developed originally from a number of farms which were located near to the Mill Pond.  The arrival of the Birmingham–Stratford canal enabled more development, and now the area has a population of around 10,000.  The Mill Pond is still there as is the old Mill House.  The area includes the Peterbrook Primary School.Nearby there is also daisy farm park and the lodge pub . It is also nearby to local shops one stop and premier 

Solihull